NSYNC in Concert  (also known as the Second II None Tour, Ain't No Stoppin' Us Now Tour, Boys of Summer Tour and The Winter Shows) is the second concert tour by American boy band, NSYNC. Primarily visiting North America, the tour supported the band's debut studio album, 'N Sync. The trek lasted eighteen months, playing over two hundred concerts in over one hundred cities. In 1998, the tour was nominated for "Best New Artist Tour" by Pollstar Concert Industry Awards. It also became one of the biggest tours in 1999, earning over $50 million. Supporting the band on the tour were newcomers Britney Spears, B*Witched and Mandy Moore along with music veterans Jordan Knight, Shanice and The Sugarhill Gang.

Background
After completing a promotional tour for their debut album, the band announced their first tour in North America. Previously, the band toured Germany for their "For the Girl Tour" in 1997. The summer outing saw the band playing in nightclubs, state fairs and radio music festivals. After the airing of their Disney Channel concert special, “NSYNC: Live in Concert”, the band's popularity grew in the United States and additional dates were added to the tour. Now known as the "Second II None Tour", the band were now playing theatres and auditoriums. Before the tour began in November 1998, the band become the opening act for Janet Jackson's The Velvet Rope Tour during concerts in October 1998.

The "Second II None Tour" leg ended in February 1999, after performing at a radio music festival in San Jose, California. Around this time, band member Lance Bass expressed the band would expand their upcoming tour to the United Kingdom. However, this did not come to fruition. The next leg of the tour, known as "Ain't No Stoppin' Us Now Tour" began in the spring of 1999. The band were now playing arenas in the United States. The tour was sponsored by Oxy Balance. During an interview with the Hartford Courant, band member JC Chasez described the tour as:"The concerts, yeah, are loud and crazy, and people scream and everything like that but it's fun. It's all in good fun. The core of the show is the same, the same old singing and dancing, NSYNC style: a high-energy, very personal performance".

While performing a concert in New Haven, Connecticut, local radio station WKCI-FM declared March 13, 1999 as "NSYNC Day". While touring in Florida, Bass became ill and missed the concerts in Tampa and Sunrise. The tour was expanded once again to the summer, now called the "Boys of Summer Tour". The band were now playing amphitheatres and stadiums. The shows were sponsored by Clairol Herbal Essences. For the August concert in Denver, the band allowed students of Columbine High School to attend the concert for free. During this time, the band was involved in a legal battle with their former manager Lou Pearlman and transitioning from RCA to Jive Records. Towards the end of the leg, the band were forced to cancel concerts due to schedule conflicts relating to their lawsuit. The group made up the dates in their final tour expansion known as "The Winter Shows". During an AOL chat in November with fans, Chasez stated the group was already planning for their next tour for their upcoming album in 2000. He also expressed hoping to tour the United Kingdom, continental Europe, Australia and Japan. During The Winter Shows, the band performed their new singles, "Bye Bye Bye" and "Music of My Heart". The leg ended with a New Year's Eve concert in Honolulu.

Personnel

NSYNC 
JC Chasez – Lead Vocals
Justin Timberlake – Lead Vocals
Chris Kirkpatrick – Backing Vocals
Lance Bass – Backing Vocals
Joey Fatone – Backing Vocals

Band
Throughout their concerts, the five were accompanied by the following instrumentalists on this tour:
Kevin Antunes – Music Director, Keyboards
Troy Antunes – Bass
Billy Ashbaugh – Drums, Percussion
Ruben Ruiz – Guitar, Keyboards
Byron Chambers – Keyboards
Paul Howards – Saxophone, Percussion, Keyboards

Opening acts

N-Tyce 
Britney Spears 
Sweetbox 
B*Witched 
Divine 
Tatyana Ali 
Blaque 
Jordan Knight 
3rd Storee 
Billy Crawford 
Raven-Symoné 
Five 
INOJ 
Mandy Moore 
Michael Africk 
P.Y.T. 
Trey D. 
Shanice 
Sugarhill Gang 
Ron Irizarry 
A–Teens 
McMaster & James 
Wild Orchid  
Innosense

Setlist

Tour dates

Music festivals and other miscellaneous performances

This concert was a part of "Wango Tango"
This concert was a part of the "Burlington Steamboat Days"
These concerts were a part of "Sweetstock"
These concerts were a part of the "B96 SummerBash"
This concert was a part of the "Waterfront Festival"
This concert was a part of "FunFest"
This concert was a part of the "Rock County 4-H Fair"
This concert was a part of the "Santa Clara County Fair"
This concert was a part of the "Clark County Fair"
This concert was a part of the "Sioux Empire Fair"
This concert was a part of the "Illinois State Fair"
This concert was a part of "Kissfest"
This concert was a part of the "Western Idaho Fair"
This concert was a part of the "Kansas State Fair"
This concert was a part of the "Kmart Convention"
This concert was a part of the "Broward County Fair"
This concert was a part of the "Jingle Ball"
This concert was a part of the "Pro Bowl"
This concert was a part of the "Skool Spirit Jam"
This concert was a part of "Disney's Summer Jam"
This concert was a part of the "KISS Concert"
This concert was a part of "Teenapalooza"
This concert was a part of the "Summer Music Mania"

Cancellations and rescheduled shows

Box office score data

Broadcasts and recordings
The band's performance at Disney's "Summer Jam" was filmed on May 12, 1999 and aired on ABC in June. Their performances at "Summer Music Mania" and "Teenapolooza" were aired on UPN on August 31, 1999. The July 2 performance at the National Car Rental Center was filmed was for a PPV special entitled, "'NSYNC 'N Concert". The concert was presented by WAM! America's Kidz Network and was made available on September 11, 1999.

Critical reception
Overall, the tour received positive elucidation from music critics and concertgoers. Gord Westmacott of the London Free Press wrote the boy band threw their female fans into a frenzy, at the Centennial Hall in London, Ontario. He continues, "All five returned to the stage for an a cappella medley of Bee Gees' songs, including 'Jive Talking' and 'How Deep Is Your Love', a move which seemed to win points with the parents and proved that yes, they really can sing. But it was the up-tempo material that drew the best response, as the members bounced around the stage in tightly choreographed dance routines, proving that they can dance too—or at least strut really well. And there was no question they knew exactly how to play the crowd, providing just enough pelvic thrusts amid the ernest and squeaky-clean production".

Kieran Grant of the Toronto Sun enjoyed the performance at the Molson Amphitheatre. He said, "Imagine the fever pitch when their helmets were dropped to reveal heart-throbs JC, Justin, Joey, Chris, and Lance—NSYNC in the flesh. Of course, there was still a heavy layer of Gortex—gloves included—to come off as the track-suited NSYNC strutted about to tunes from their self-titled debut album. The group delighted their fans with their fluid and casual dance moves, hootin' and hollerin' and just-this-side-of-bad-boy posturing". Mike Ross of Music Express called the performance at Skyreach Centre a "fusion of a rock 'n roll concert and a visit to Disneyland. He explained, "The crowd was on its feet—screaming, screaming, all that screaming ... There was actually something to scream about. Say what you want about boy-groups with millions of dollars in production at their disposal. They may be pinnacle of pop fluff, but they're not putting on boring concerts".

References

NSYNC concert tours
1998 concert tours
1999 concert tours
2000 concert tours